The Uralic languages (sometimes called Uralian languages ) form a language family of 38 languages spoken by approximately 25million people, predominantly in Europe and northern Asia. The Uralic languages with the most native speakers are Hungarian (which alone accounts for more than half of the family's speakers), Finnish, and Estonian. Other significant languages with fewer speakers are Erzya, Moksha, Mari, Udmurt, Sami, Komi, and Vepsian, all of which are spoken in northern regions of Scandinavia and the Russian Federation.

The name "Uralic" derives from the family's purported "original homeland" (Urheimat) hypothesized to have been somewhere in the vicinity of the Ural Mountains.

Finno-Ugric is sometimes used as a synonym for Uralic, though Finno-Ugric is widely understood to exclude the Samoyedic languages. Scholars who do not accept the traditional notion that Samoyedic split first from the rest of the Uralic family may treat the terms as synonymous.

History

Homeland

Proposed homelands of the Proto-Uralic language include:

 The vicinity of the Volga River, west of the Urals, close to the Urheimat of the Indo-European languages, or to the east and southeast of the Urals. Historian Gyula László places its origin in the forest zone between the Oka River and central Poland. E. N. Setälä and M. Zsirai place it between the Volga and Kama Rivers. According to E. Itkonen, the ancestral area extended to the Baltic Sea. Jaakko Häkkinen identifies Proto-Uralic with Eneolithic Garino-Bor (Turbin) culture 3,000–2,500 YBP located in the Lower Kama Basin.
 P. Hajdu has suggested a homeland in western and northwestern Siberia.
 Juha Janhunen suggests a homeland in between the Ob and Yenisei drainage areas in Central Siberia.
In 2022, a group of scholars, including Janhunen, noted that early Uralic-speakers can be associated with hunter-gatherers in Western Siberia. The spread of Uralic languages may be linked, in part, due to the Seima-Turbino phenomenon, but no conclusive evidence exists so far. According to Bjørn Rasmus G., the Proto-Uralic speakers may be associated with the Okunev culture, and may have shown affinity to the earlier Botai and Tarim mummies.

Early attestations
The first plausible mention of a people speaking a Uralic language is in Tacitus's Germania (c. 98 AD), mentioning the Fenni (usually interpreted as referring to the Sami) and two other possibly Uralic tribes living in the farthest reaches of Scandinavia. There are many possible earlier mentions, including the Iyrcae (perhaps related to Yugra) described by Herodotus living in what is now European Russia, and the Budini, described by Herodotus as notably red-haired (a characteristic feature of the Udmurts) and living in northeast Ukraine and/or adjacent parts of Russia. In the late 15th century, European scholars noted the resemblance of the names Hungaria and Yugria, the names of settlements east of the Ural. They assumed a connection but did not seek linguistic evidence.

Uralic studies

The affinity of Hungarian and Finnish was first proposed in the late 17th century. Three candidates can be credited for the discovery: the German scholar Martin Vogel, the Swedish scholar Georg Stiernhielm and the Swedish courtier Bengt Skytte. Vogel's unpublished study of the relationship, commissioned by Cosimo III of Tuscany, was clearly the most modern of these: he established several grammatical and lexical parallels between Finnish and Hungarian as well as Sami. Stiernhielm commented on the similarities of Sami, Estonian and Finnish, and also on a few similar words between Finnish and Hungarian. These authors were the first to outline what was to become the classification of the Finno-Ugric, and later Uralic family. This proposal received some of its initial impetus from the fact that these languages, unlike most of the other languages spoken in Europe, are not part of what is now known as the Indo-European family. In 1717, the Swedish professor Olof Rudbeck proposed about 100 etymologies connecting Finnish and Hungarian, of which about 40 are still considered valid. Several early reports comparing Finnish or Hungarian with Mordvin, Mari or Khanty were additionally collected by Leibniz and edited by his assistant Johann Georg von Eckhart.

In 1730, Philip Johan von Strahlenberg published his book  (The Northern and Eastern Parts of Europe and Asia), surveying the geography, peoples and languages of Russia. All the main groups of the Uralic languages were already identified here. Nonetheless, these relationships were not widely accepted. Hungarian intellectuals especially were not interested in the theory and preferred to assume connections with Turkic tribes, an attitude characterized by Merritt Ruhlen as due to "the wild unfettered Romanticism of the epoch". Still, in spite of this hostile climate, the Hungarian Jesuit János Sajnovics travelled with Maximilian Hell to survey the alleged relationship between Hungarian and Sami. Sajnovics published his results in 1770, arguing for a relationship based on several grammatical features. In 1799, the Hungarian Sámuel Gyarmathi published the most complete work on Finno-Ugric to that date.

Up to the beginning of the 19th century, knowledge on the Uralic languages spoken in Russia had remained restricted to scanty observations by travelers. Already the Finnish historian Henrik Gabriel Porthan had stressed that further progress would require dedicated field missions. One of the first of these was undertaken by Anders Johan Sjögren, who brought the Vepsians to general knowledge and elucidated in detail the relatedness of Finnish and Komi. Still more extensive were the field research expeditions made in the 1840s by Matthias Castrén (1813–1852) and Antal Reguly (1819–1858), who focused especially on the Samoyedic and the Ob-Ugric languages, respectively. Reguly's materials were worked on by the Hungarian linguist Pál Hunfalvy (1810–1891) and German Josef Budenz (1836–1892), who both supported the Uralic affinity of Hungarian. Budenz was the first scholar to bring this result to popular consciousness in Hungary, and to attempt a reconstruction of the Proto-Finno-Ugric grammar and lexicon. Another late-19th-century Hungarian contribution is that of Ignácz Halász (1855–1901), who published extensive comparative material of Finno-Ugric and Samoyedic in the 1890s, and whose work is at the base of today's wide acceptance of the inclusion of Samoyedic as a part of Uralic. Meanwhile, in the autonomous Grand Duchy of Finland, a chair for Finnish language and linguistics at the University of Helsinki was created in 1850, first held by Castrén.

In 1883, the Finno-Ugrian Society was founded in Helsinki on the proposal of Otto Donner, which would lead to Helsinki overtaking St. Petersburg as the chief northern center of research of the Uralic languages. During the late 19th and early 20th century (until the separation of Finland from Russia following the Russian Revolution), the Society hired many scholars to survey the still less known Uralic languages. Major researchers of this period included Heikki Paasonen (studying especially the Mordvinic languages), Yrjö Wichmann (studying Permic), Artturi Kannisto (Mansi), Kustaa Fredrik Karjalainen (Khanty), Toivo Lehtisalo (Nenets), and Kai Donner (Kamass). The vast amounts of data collected on these expeditions would provide edition work for later generations of Finnish Uralicists for more than a century.

Classification

The Uralic family comprises nine undisputed groups with no consensus classification between them. (Some of the proposals are listed in the next section.) An agnostic approach treats them as separate branches.

Obsolete or native names are displayed in italics.
 Finnic (Fennic, Baltic Finnic, Balto-Finnic, Balto-Fennic)
 Hungarian (Magyar)
 Khanty (Ostyak, Handi, Hantõ)
 Mansi (Vogul)
 Mari (Cheremis)
 Mordvinic (Mordvin, Mordvinian)
 Permic (Permian)
 Sami (Saami, Samic, Saamic, Lappic, Lappish)
 Samoyedic (Samoyed)

There is also historical evidence of a number of extinct languages of uncertain affiliation:
 Merya
 Muromian
 Meshcherian (until 16th century?)

Traces of Finno-Ugric substrata, especially in toponymy, in the northern part of European Russia have been proposed as evidence for even more extinct Uralic languages.

Traditional classification
All Uralic languages are thought to have descended, through independent processes of language change, from Proto-Uralic. The internal structure of the Uralic family has been debated since the family was first proposed. Doubts about the validity of most or all of the proposed higher-order branchings (grouping the nine undisputed families) are becoming more common.

A traditional classification of the Uralic languages has existed since the late 19th century. It has enjoyed frequent adaptation in whole or in part in encyclopedias, handbooks, and overviews of the Uralic family. Otto Donner's model from 1879 is as follows:

 Ugric (Ugrian)
 Hungarian
 Ob-Ugric (Ob-Ugrian)
 Khanty
 Mansi
 Finno-Permic (Permian-Finnic)
 Permic
 Finno-Volgaic (Finno-Cheremisic, Finno-Mari)
 Volga-Finnic
 Mari
 Mordvinic
 Finno-Lappic (Finno-Saamic, Finno-Samic)
 Sami
 Finnic

At Donner's time, the Samoyedic languages were still poorly known, and he was not able to address their position. As they became better known in the early 20th century, they were found to be quite divergent, and they were assumed to have separated already early on. The terminology adopted for this was "Uralic" for the entire family, "Finno-Ugric" for the non-Samoyedic languages (though "Finno-Ugric" has, to this day, remained in use also as a synonym for the whole family). Finno-Ugric and Samoyedic are listed in ISO 639-5 as primary branches of Uralic.

The following table lists nodes of the traditional family tree that are recognized in some overview sources.

Little explicit evidence has however been presented in favour of Donner's model since his original proposal, and numerous alternate schemes have been proposed. Especially in Finland, there has been a growing tendency to reject the Finno-Ugric intermediate protolanguage. A recent competing proposal instead unites Ugric and Samoyedic in an "East Uralic" group for which shared innovations can be noted.

The Finno-Permic grouping still holds some support, though the arrangement of its subgroups is a matter of some dispute. Mordvinic is commonly seen as particularly closely related to or part of Finno-Samic. The term Volgaic (or Volga-Finnic) was used to denote a branch previously believed to include Mari, Mordvinic and a number of the extinct languages, but it is now obsolete and considered a geographic classification rather than a linguistic one.

Within Ugric, uniting Mansi with Hungarian rather than Khanty has been a competing hypothesis to Ob-Ugric.

Lexical isoglosses
Lexicostatistics has been used in defense of the traditional family tree. A recent re-evaluation of the evidence however fails to find support for Finno-Ugric and Ugric, suggesting four lexically distinct branches (Finno-Permic, Hungarian, Ob-Ugric and Samoyedic).

One alternate proposal for a family tree, with emphasis on the development of numerals, is as follows:
 Uralic ( "2",  "5" / "10")
 Samoyedic (*op "1", *ketä "2", *näkur "3", *tettə "4", *səmpəleŋkə "5", *məktut "6", *sejtwə "7", *wiət "10")
 Finno-Ugric ( "1",  "3",  "4",  "5",  "6",  "10")
 Mansic
 Mansi
 Hungarian (hét "7"; replacement egy "1")
 Finno-Khantic (reshaping *kolmi "3" on the analogy of "4")
 Khanty
 Finno-Permic (reshaping *kektä > *kakta)
 Permic
 Finno-Volgaic (*śećem "7")
 Mari
 Finno-Saamic (*kakteksa, *ükteksa "8, 9")
 Saamic
 Finno-Mordvinic (replacement *kümmen "10" (*luki- "to count", "to read out"))
 Mordvinic
 Finnic

Phonological isoglosses
Another proposed tree, more divergent from the standard, focusing on consonant isoglosses (which does not consider the position of the Samoyedic languages) is presented by Viitso (1997), and refined in Viitso (2000):
 Finno-Ugric
 Saamic–Fennic (consonant gradation)
 Saamic
 Fennic
 Eastern Finno-Ugric
Mordva
(node)
 Mari
 Permian–Ugric (*δ > *l)
 Permian
 Ugric (*s *š *ś > *ɬ *ɬ *s)
 Hungarian
 Khanty
 Mansi
The grouping of the four bottom-level branches remains to some degree open to interpretation, with competing models of Finno-Saamic vs. Eastern Finno-Ugric (Mari, Mordvinic, Permic-Ugric; *k > ɣ between vowels, degemination of stops) and Finno-Volgaic (Finno-Saamic, Mari, Mordvinic; *δʲ > *ð between vowels) vs. Permic-Ugric. Viitso finds no evidence for a Finno-Permic grouping.

Extending this approach to cover the Samoyedic languages suggests affinity with Ugric, resulting in the aforementioned East Uralic grouping, as it also shares the same sibilant developments. A further non-trivial Ugric-Samoyedic isogloss is the reduction *k, *x, *w > ɣ when before *i, and after a vowel (cf. *k > ɣ above), or adjacent to *t, *s, *š, or *ś.

Finno-Ugric consonant developments after Viitso (2000); Samoyedic changes after Sammallahti (1988)

Note: Proto-Khanty *ɬ in many of the dialects yields *t; Häkkinen assumes this also happened in Mansi and Samoyedic.

The inverse relationship between consonant gradation and medial lenition of stops (the pattern also continuing within the three families where gradation is found) is noted by Helimski (1995): an original allophonic gradation system between voiceless and voiced stops would have been easily disrupted by a spreading of voicing to previously unvoiced stops as well.

Honkola, et al. (2013)
A computational phylogenetic study by Honkola, et al. (2013) classifies the Uralic languages as follows. Estimated divergence dates from Honkola, et al. (2013) are also given.

Uralic (5300 YBP)
Samoyedic
Finno-Ugric (3900 YBP)
Ugric (3300 YBP)
Hungarian
Ob-Ugric (1900 YBP)
Khanty
Mansi
Finno-Permic (3700 YBP)
Permian
Udmurt
Komi
Finno-Volgaic
Mari (3200 YBP)
(core branch)
Erzya (2900 YBP) (Mordvinic)
Finno-Saami
Sami (800 YBP)
Finnic (1200 YBP)

Typology
Structural characteristics generally said to be typical of Uralic languages include:

Grammar
 extensive use of independent suffixes (agglutination)
 a large set of grammatical cases marked with agglutinative suffixes (13–14 cases on average; mainly later developments: Proto-Uralic is reconstructed with 6 cases), e.g.:
 Erzya: 12 cases
 Estonian: 14 cases (15 cases with instructive)
 Finnish: 15 cases
 Hungarian: 18 cases (together 34 grammatical cases and case-like suffixes)
 Inari Sami: 9 cases
 Komi: in certain dialects as many as 27 cases
 Moksha: 13 cases
 Nenets: 7 cases
 North Sami: 6 cases
 Udmurt: 16 cases
 Veps: 24 cases
 unique Uralic case system, from which all modern Uralic languages derive their case systems.
 nominative singular has no case suffix.
 accusative and genitive suffixes are nasal consonants (-n, -m, etc.)
 three-way distinction in the local case system, with each set of local cases being divided into forms corresponding roughly to "from", "to", and "in/at"; especially evident, e.g. in Hungarian, Finnish and Estonian, which have several sets of local cases, such as the "inner", "outer" and "on top" systems in Hungarian, while in Finnish the "on top" forms have merged to the "outer" forms.
 the Uralic locative suffix exists in all Uralic languages in various cases, e.g. Hungarian superessive, Finnish essive (-na), North Sami essive, Erzyan inessive, and Nenets locative.
 the Uralic lative suffix exists in various cases in many Uralic languages, e.g. Hungarian illative, Finnish lative (-s as in ulos 'out' and rannemmas 'more towards the shore'), Erzyan illative, Komi approximative, and Northern Sami locative.
 a lack of grammatical gender, including one pronoun for both he and she; for example, hän in Finnish, tämä in Votic, tämā or ta (short form for tämā) in Livonian, tema or ta (short form for tema) in Estonian, sijə in Komi, ő in Hungarian.
 negative verb, which exists in almost all Uralic languages (notably absent in Hungarian)
 use of postpositions as opposed to prepositions (prepositions are uncommon).
 possessive suffixes
 the genitive is also used to express possession in some languages, e.g. Estonian mu koer, colloquial Finnish mun koira, Northern Sami mu beana 'my dog' (literally 'dog of me'). Separate possessive adjectives and possessive pronouns, such as my and your, are rare.
 dual, in the Samoyedic, Ob-Ugric and Samic languages and reconstructed for Proto-Uralic
 plural markers -j (i) and -t (-d, -q) have a common origin (e.g. in Finnish, Estonian, Võro, Erzya, Samic languages, Samoyedic languages). Hungarian, however, has -i- before the possessive suffixes and -k elsewhere. The plural marker -k is also used in the Samic languages, but there is a regular merging of final -k and -t in Samic, so it can come from either ending.
 Possessions are expressed by a possessor in the adessive or dative case, the verb "be" (the copula, instead of the verb "have") and the possessed with or without a possessive suffix. The grammatical subject of the sentence is thus the possessed. In Finnish, for example, the possessor is in the adessive case: "Minulla on kala", literally "At me is fish", i.e. "I have a fish", whereas in Hungarian, the possessor is in the dative case, but appears overtly only if it is contrastive, while the possessed has a possessive ending indicating the number and person of the possessor: "(Nekem) van egy halam", literally "(To me [dative]) is a fish-my" ("(For me) there is a fish of mine"), i.e. "(As for me,) I have a fish".
 expressions that include a numeral are singular if they refer to things which form a single group, e.g. "négy csomó" in Hungarian, "njeallje čuolmma" in Northern Sami, "neli sõlme" in Estonian, and "neljä solmua" in Finnish, each of which means "four knots", but the literal approximation is "four knot". (This approximation is accurate only for Hungarian among these examples, as in Northern Sami the noun is in the singular accusative/genitive case and in Finnish and Estonian the singular noun is in the partitive case, such that the number points to a part of a larger mass, like "four of knot(s)".)

Phonology
 Vowel harmony: this is present in many but by no means all Uralic languages. It exists in Hungarian and various Baltic-Finnic languages, and is present to some degree elsewhere, such as in Mordvinic, Mari, Eastern Khanty, and Samoyedic. It is lacking in Sami, Permic and standard Estonian, while it does exist in Võro and elsewhere in South Estonian, as well as in Kihnu Island subdialect of North Estonian. (Although double dot diacritics are used in writing Uralic languages, the languages do not exhibit Germanic umlaut, a different type of vowel assimilation.)
 Large vowel inventories. For example, some Selkup varieties have over twenty different monophthongs, and Estonian has over twenty different diphthongs.
 Palatalization of consonants; in this context, palatalization means a secondary articulation, where the middle of the tongue is tense. For example, pairs like  – [n], or [c] – [t] are contrasted in Hungarian, as in hattyú  "swan". Some Sami languages, for example Skolt Sami, distinguish three degrees: plain  [l], palatalized  , and palatal  , where  has a primary alveolar articulation, while  has a primary palatal articulation. Original Uralic palatalization is phonemic, independent of the following vowel and traceable to the millennia-old Proto-Uralic. It is different from Slavic palatalization, which is of more recent origin. The Finnic languages have lost palatalization, but several of them have reacquired it, so Finnic palatalization (where extant) was originally dependent on the following vowel and does not correlate to palatalization elsewhere in Uralic.
 Lack of phonologically contrastive tone.
 In many Uralic languages, the stress is always on the first syllable, though Nganasan shows (essentially) penultimate stress, and a number of languages of the central region (Erzya, Mari, Udmurt and Komi-Permyak) synchronically exhibit a lexical accent. The Erzya language can vary its stress in words to give specific nuances to sentential meaning.

Lexicography
Basic vocabulary of about 200 words, including body parts (e.g. eye, heart, head, foot, mouth), family members (e.g. father, mother-in-law), animals (e.g. viper, partridge, fish), nature objects (e.g. tree, stone, nest, water), basic verbs (e.g. live, fall, run, make, see, suck, go, die, swim, know), basic pronouns (e.g. who, what, we, you, I), numerals (e.g. two, five); derivatives increase the number of common words.

Selected cognates

The following is a very brief selection of cognates in basic vocabulary across the Uralic family, which may serve to give an idea of the sound changes involved. This is not a list of translations: cognates have a common origin, but their meaning may be shifted and loanwords may have replaced them.

Orthographical notes: The hacek denotes postalveolar articulation (In Northern Sami,, while the acute denotes a secondary palatal articulation or, in Hungarian, vowel length.

As is apparent from the list, Finnish is the most conservative of the Uralic languages presented here, with nearly half the words on the list above identical to their Proto-Uralic reconstructions and most of the remainder only having minor changes, such as the conflation of *ś into /s/, or widespread changes such as the loss of *x and alteration of *ï. Finnish has even preserved old Indo-European borrowings relatively unchanged as well. (An example  is porsas ("pig"), loaned from Proto-Indo-European *porḱos or pre-Proto-Indo-Iranian *porśos, unchanged since loaning save for loss of palatalization, *ś > s.)

Mutual intelligibility
The Estonian philologist Mall Hellam proposed cognate sentences that she asserted to be mutually intelligible among the three most widely spoken Uralic languages: Finnish, Estonian, and Hungarian:

.
.
.
.

However, linguist Geoffrey Pullum reports that neither Finns nor Hungarians could understand the other language's version of the sentence.

Comparison
No Uralic language has exactly the idealized typological profile of the family. Typological features with varying presence among the modern Uralic language groups include:

Notes:
 Clearly present only in Nganasan.
 Vowel harmony is present in the Uralic languages of Siberia only in some marginal archaic varieties: Nganasan, Southern Mansi and Eastern Khanty.
Only recently lost in modern Estonian
 A number of umlaut processes are found in Livonian.
 In Komi, but not in Udmurt.

Proposed relations with other language families
Many relationships between Uralic and other language families have been suggested, but none of these is generally accepted by linguists at the present time: All of the following hypotheses are minority views at the present time in Uralic studies.

Uralic-Yukaghir

The Uralic–Yukaghir hypothesis identifies Uralic and Yukaghir as independent members of a single language 
family. It is currently widely accepted that the similarities between Uralic and Yukaghir languages are due to ancient contacts. Regardless, the hypothesis is accepted by a few linguists and viewed as attractive by a somewhat larger number.

Eskimo-Uralic

The Eskimo–Uralic hypothesis associates Uralic with the Eskimo–Aleut languages. This is an old thesis whose antecedents go back to the 18th century. An important restatement of it was made by Bergsland (1959).

Uralo-Siberian

Uralo-Siberian is an expanded form of the Eskimo–Uralic hypothesis. It associates Uralic with Yukaghir, Chukotko-Kamchatkan, and Eskimo–Aleut. It was propounded by Michael Fortescue in 1998. It is currently the most supported hypothesis regarding close relatives of Uralic. Modern supporters include Morris Swadesh, Juha Janhunen and Häkkinen. Michael Fortescue (2017) presents new linguistic evidence along with several genetic studies which support a common origin of the included groups, with a suggested homeland somewhere in Northeast Asia.

Ural-Altaic

Theories proposing a close relationship with the Altaic languages were formerly popular, based on similarities in vocabulary as well as in grammatical and phonological features, in particular the similarities in the Uralic and Altaic pronouns and the presence of agglutination in both sets of languages, as well as vowel harmony in some. For example, the word for "language" is similar in Estonian (keel) and Mongolian (хэл (hel)). These theories are now generally rejected and most such similarities are attributed to language contact or coincidence.

Indo-Uralic

The Indo-Uralic (or "Indo-Euralic") hypothesis suggests that Uralic and Indo-European are related at a fairly close level or, in its stronger form, that they are more closely related than either is to any other language family.

Uralo-Dravidian
The hypothesis that the Dravidian languages display similarities with the Uralic language group, suggesting a prolonged period of contact in the past, is popular amongst Dravidian linguists and has been supported by a number of scholars, including Robert Caldwell, Thomas Burrow, Kamil Zvelebil, and Mikhail Andronov. This hypothesis has, however, been rejected by some specialists in Uralic languages, and has in recent times also been criticised by other Dravidian linguists, such as Bhadriraju Krishnamurti.

Nostratic

Nostratic associates Uralic, Indo-European, Altaic, Dravidian, and various other language families of Asia. The Nostratic hypothesis was first propounded by Holger Pedersen in 1903 and subsequently revived by Vladislav Illich-Svitych and Aharon Dolgopolsky in the 1960s.

Eurasiatic

Eurasiatic resembles Nostratic in including Uralic, Indo-European, and Altaic, but differs from it in excluding the South Caucasian languages, Dravidian, and Afroasiatic and including Chukotko-Kamchatkan, Nivkh, Ainu, and Eskimo–Aleut. It was propounded by Joseph Greenberg in 2000–2002. Similar ideas had earlier been expressed by Heinrich Koppelmann in 1933 and by Björn Collinder in 1965.

Uralic skepticism
The linguist Angela Marcantonio has argued against the validity of several subgroups of the Uralic family, as well against the family itself, claiming that many of the languages are no more closely related to each other than they are to various other Eurasian languages (e.g. Yukaghir or Turkic), and that in particular Hungarian is a language isolate.

Marcantonio's proposal has been strongly dismissed by most reviewers as unfounded and methodologically flawed. Problems identified by reviewers include:
 Misrepresentation of the amount of comparative evidence behind the Uralic family, by arbitrarily ignoring data and mis-counting the number of examples known of various regular sound correspondences
 After arguing against the proposal of a Ugric subgroup within Uralic, claiming that this would constitute evidence that Hungarian and the Ob-Ugric languages have no relationship at all
 Excessive focus on criticizing the work of early pioneer studies on the Uralic family, while ignoring newer, more detailed work published in the 20th century
 Criticizing the evidence for the Uralic family as unsystematic and statistically insignificant, yet freely proposing alternate relationships based on even scarcer and even less systematic evidence.
A more ambiguous review comes from linguist Edward Vajda, who does not, however, specialize in Uralic languages. Although he also rejects all of the book's new proposals (including the author's dismissal of Uralic as a language family), he agrees that Marcantonio has raised a number of worthwhile questions that both Uralicists and non-Uralicists should aim to answer seriously.

Other comparisons
Various unorthodox comparisons have been advanced. These are considered at best spurious fringe-theories by specialists:

Finno-Basque
 Hungarian-Etruscan
 Sino-Uralic languages
 Cal-Ugrian theory
Dené-Finnish (Sino-Tibetan, Na-Dené and Uralic)
Minoan-Uralic
 Alternative theories of Hungarian language origins

Comparison 
Article 1 of the Universal Declaration of Human Rights (in English): All human beings are born free and equal in dignity and rights. They are endowed with reason and conscience and should act towards one another in a spirit of brotherhood.

Comparison of the text in prominent Uralic languages:

Finnish:

Kaikki ihmiset syntyvät vapaina ja tasavertaisina arvoltaan ja oikeuksiltaan. Heille on annettu järki ja omatunto, ja heidän on toimittava toisiaan kohtaan veljeyden hengessä.

Livvi-Karelian:

Kai rahvas roittahes vällinny da taza-arvozinnu omas arvos da oigevuksis. Jogahizele heis on annettu mieli da omatundo da heil vältämättäh pidäy olla keskenäh, kui vellil.

Veps:

Kaik mehed sünduba joudajin i kohtaižin, ühtejiččin ičeze arvokahudes i oiktusiš. Heile om anttud mel’ i huiktusentund i heile tariž kožuda toine toiženke kut vel’l’kundad.

Estonian:

Kõik inimesed sünnivad vabadena ja võrdsetena oma väärikuselt ja õigustelt. Neile on antud mõistus ja südametunnistus ja nende suhtumist üksteisesse peab kandma vendluse vaim.

Livonian:

Amād rovzt attõ sindõnd brīd ja īdlizt eņtš vǟrtitõks ja õigiztõks. Näntõn um andtõd mūoštõks ja sidāmtundimi, ja näntõn um īdtuoisõ tuoimõmõst veļkub vaimsõ.

Northern Sami: 

Buot olbmot leat riegádan friddjan ja olmmošárvvu ja olmmošvuoigatvuođaid dáfus. Sii leat jierbmalaš olbmot geain lea oamedovdu ja sii gálggaše leat dego vieljačagat.

Komi:

Bydös otirys čužöny vol’nöjеzön da ötkoddеzön dostoinstvoyn da pravoèzyn. Nylö sеtöm myvkyd da sovеst’ ovny ötamödnysköt kydz vonnèzlö. 

Nenets:

Et xibjari nenėc’ sojamarianta xurkari pravada tnjava, ṇoboj nenėcja nidu nic’ tokalba, ṇybtamba ilevatu tara. 

Hungarian:

Minden emberi lény szabadon születik és egyenlő méltósága és joga van. Az emberek, ésszel és lelkiismerettel bírván, egymással szemben testvéri szellemben kell hogy viseltessenek.

See also

List of Uralic languages

Notes

References
 Abondolo, Daniel M. (editor). 1998. The Uralic Languages. London and New York: Routledge. .
 
 Collinder, Björn. 1955. Fenno-Ugric Vocabulary: An Etymological Dictionary of the Uralic Languages. (Collective work.) Stockholm: Almqvist & Viksell. (Second, revised edition: Hamburg: Helmut Buske Verlag, 1977.)
 Collinder, Björn. 1957. Survey of the Uralic Languages. Stockholm.
 Collinder, Björn. 1960. Comparative Grammar of the Uralic Languages. Stockholm: Almqvist & Wiksell
 Comrie, Bernhard. 1988. "General Features of the Uralic Languages."  In The Uralic Languages, edited by Denis Sinor, pp. 451–477. Leiden: Brill.
 Décsy, Gyula. 1990. The Uralic Protolanguage: A Comprehensive Reconstruction. Bloomington, Indiana.
 Hajdu, Péter. 1963. Finnugor népek és nyelvek. Budapest: Gondolat kiadó.
 Helimski, Eugene. Comparative Linguistics, Uralic Studies. Lectures and Articles. Moscow. 2000.
 Laakso, Johanna. 1992. Uralilaiset kansat ('Uralic Peoples'). Porvoo – Helsinki – Juva. .
.
 Napolskikh, Vladimir. The First Stages of Origin of People of Uralic Language Family: Material of Mythological Reconstruction. Moscow, 1991.
 Rédei, Károly (editor). 1986–88. Uralisches etymologisches Wörterbuch ('Uralic Etymological Dictionary'). Budapest.

External classification
 Sauvageot, Aurélien. 1930. Recherches sur le vocabulaire des langues ouralo-altaïques ('Research on the Vocabulary of the Uralo-Altaic Languages'). Paris.

Linguistic issues
 Künnap, A. 2000. Contact-induced Perspectives in Uralic Linguistics. LINCOM Studies in Asian Linguistics 39. München: LINCOM Europa. .
 Wickman, Bo. 1955. The Form of the Object in the Uralic Languages. Uppsala: Lundequistska bokhandeln.

Further reading
 Bakró-Nagy, Marianne. "The Uralic Languages". In: Revue belge de philologie et d'histoire, tome 90, fasc. 3, 2012. Langues et littératures modernes. Moderne taal en letterkunde. pp. 1001–1027. DOI: The Uralic Languages; www.persee.fr/doc/rbph_0035-0818_2012_num_90_3_8272
  (2015). "The Language Contact Situation in Prehistoric Northeastern Europe". The Linguistic Roots of Europe: Origin and Development of European Languages. Copenhagen Studies in Indo-European 6. Copenhagen: Museum Tusculanum Press, 2015. pp. 77-102.

External links

 "The Finno-Ugrics" The Economist, December 20, 2005
 Kulonen, Ulla-Maija: Origin of Finnish and related languages. thisisFINLAND, Finland Promotion Board. Cited 30.10.2009.

Syrjänen, Kaj, Lehtinen, Jyri, Vesakoski, Outi, de Heer, Mervi, Suutari, Toni, Dunn, Michael, … Leino, Unni-Päivä. (2018). lexibank/uralex: UraLex basic vocabulary dataset (Version v1.0) [Data set]. Zenodo.

"Rebel" Uralists
 "The 'Ugric-Turkic battle': a critical review" by Angela Marcantonio, Pirjo Nummenaho, and Michela Salvagni
 "Linguistic shadow-boxing" by Johanna Laakso – a book review of Angela Marcantonio's The Uralic Language Family: Facts, Myths and Statistics

Notes

 
Agglutinative languages
Language families
Languages of Russia
Languages of Finland
Languages of Hungary
Languages of Estonia